Jean-Marc Schaer (born 1 January 1953, in Dunières) is a French retired professional football striker.

External links
Profile
Profile

1953 births
Living people
Sportspeople from Haute-Loire
French footballers
Association football forwards
AS Saint-Étienne players
AJ Auxerre players
OGC Nice players
Valenciennes FC players
FC Sète 34 players
Ligue 1 players
Ligue 2 players
Olympic footballers of France
Footballers at the 1976 Summer Olympics
AS Moulins players
Association football midfielders
Footballers from Auvergne-Rhône-Alpes